David Wakefield (4 May 1936 – 14 September 2022) was an English professional rugby league footballer who played in the 1950s and 1960s.

Wakefield died on 14 September 2022, at the age of 86.

References

External links
Search for "Wakefield" at rugbyleagueproject.org
Sportsmen & Clubs at stanleyhistoryonline.com
Stanley Rangers - Club History 15
Stanley Rangers - Club History 16
Stanley Rangers - Club History 17

1936 births
2022 deaths
Place of birth missing
Doncaster R.L.F.C. players
Rugby league hookers
Wakefield Trinity players